Goran Stojanović (born 24 February 1977) is a Montenegrin-Qatari handball player for the Al Rayyan and the Qatar.

Club career
After starting out at his hometown club Mornar Bar, Stojanović played for Crvena zvezda (2000–2002), Lovćen (2002–2004), Grasshoppers (2004–2005), VfL Pfullingen (2005–2006), VfL Gummersbach (2006–2011), Rhein-Neckar Löwen (2011–2014) and El Jaish (2014–2017) and Al Rayyan (2022–present).

International career
At international level, Stojanović represented Montenegro at the 2008 European Championship in the nation's debut appearance in major tournaments. He later switched his allegiance to Qatar, winning the gold medal at the 2014 Asian Championship. Stojanović was a member of the team that finished as runners-up at the 2015 World Championship. He subsequently helped Qatar win the 2016 Asian Championship and later participated at the 2016 Summer Olympics. Stojanović also won two gold medals at the Asian Games (2014 and 2018).

Honours
Lovćen
 Serbia and Montenegro Handball Cup: 2002–03
VfL Gummersbach
 EHF Cup: 2008–09
 EHF Cup Winners' Cup: 2009–10, 2010–11
Rhein-Neckar Löwen
 EHF Cup: 2012–13
El Jaish
 Asian Club League Handball Championship: 2014

References

External links

 
 
 

1977 births
Living people
People from Bar, Montenegro
Naturalised citizens of Qatar
Qatari people of Montenegrin descent
Montenegrin male handball players
Qatari male handball players
Olympic handball players of Qatar
Handball players at the 2016 Summer Olympics
Handball players at the 2014 Asian Games
Handball players at the 2018 Asian Games
Medalists at the 2014 Asian Games
Medalists at the 2018 Asian Games
Asian Games medalists in handball
Asian Games gold medalists for Qatar
RK Crvena zvezda players
VfL Gummersbach players
Rhein-Neckar Löwen players
Handball-Bundesliga players
Expatriate handball players
Montenegrin expatriate sportspeople in Switzerland
Montenegrin expatriate sportspeople in Germany
Montenegrin expatriate sportspeople in Qatar